Punching the Sky is the eighth studio album by American heavy metal band Armored Saint.  It was released on October 23, 2020. The album was produced by Bill Metoyer and bassist Joey Vera, and mixed by Jay Ruston. The track "End of the Attention Span" was the first single and was released on August 12, 2020, along with a music video. A music video was also made for the next single "Lone Wolf" on June 29, 2021.

Track listing

Personnel
Band Members
 John Bush – lead vocals
 Phil Sandoval – lead guitar
 Jeff Duncan – lead guitar
 Joey Vera – bass, backing vocals, percussion
 Gonzo Sandoval – drums

Additional musicians
Jason Constantine – backing vocals
Dizzy Reed – Hammond B3, piano

Production 
Joey Vera – production, engineering, mixing
Bill Metoyer – producer, engineering
Josh Newell – engineering
Jay Ruston – mixing
Ryan Williams – mixing
Paul Logus – mastering
Anthony Biuso – technician (drums)
Heidi Weaver – product manager
Brian J. Ames – layout
Steve Stone – cover art
Travis Shinn - photography

References

2020 albums
Armored Saint albums
Metal Blade Records albums